Peggy Nietgen (born 12 August 1986), née Kuznik,  is a German football defender. She currently plays for 1. FC Köln.

Career 
Kuznik began her career at the age of five at SV Blau-Weiß Tröbitz. She joined the academy of 1. FFC Turbine Potsdam in 2000. Upon graduation in 2002, she became a permanent member of Turbine’s first team. Kuznik has won the national championship seven times and the national cup nine times, over the course of spells at Potsdam, Lokomotive Leipzig, SC 07 Bad Neuenahr and 1.FFC Frankfurt. Kuznik also had signed for VfL Wolfsburg in 2013, but cancelled her contract before making any appearances for the club.

Kuznik has won the UEFA Women's Cup in 2005, the German championship in 2004 and 2006 and the German cup in 2004, 2005, 2006 and 2014. She also won the under-19 World Cup in 2004.

References

External links 

1986 births
Living people
People from Finsterwalde
People from Bezirk Cottbus
German women's footballers
Footballers from Brandenburg
1. FFC Frankfurt players
1. FFC Turbine Potsdam players
SC 07 Bad Neuenahr players
VfL Wolfsburg (women) players
Women's association football defenders
Women's association football midfielders
20th-century German women
1. FC Köln (women) players